Helle Sofie Sagøy (born 19 January 1998) is a Norwegian para badminton player who competes in international level events. She was born without her right lower leg and has used a prosthetic all her life.

She was awarded the BWF Para-Badminton Player of the Year in 2015 after winning two gold medal at the 2015 BWF Para-Badminton World Championships in Stoke Mandeville.

Sagøy competed for Norway at the 2020 Summer Paralympics.

Achievements

World Championships 

Women's singles

Women's doubles

European Championships 
Women's singles

Women's doubles

Mixed doubles

BWF Para Badminton World Circuit (3 titles) 
The BWF Para Badminton World Circuit – Grade 2, Level 1, 2 and 3 tournaments has been sanctioned by the Badminton World Federation from 2022.

Men's singles

International Tournaments (11 titles, 9 runners-up) 
Women's singles

Women's doubles

Mixed doubles

References

Notes

External links
 
 
 

1998 births
Living people
People from Klæbu
Norwegian para-badminton players
Paralympic badminton players of Norway
Badminton players at the 2020 Summer Paralympics
Sportspeople from Trøndelag